Barthélemy Gillard (born 24 May 1935) is a Belgian former cyclist. He competed in the team pursuit at the 1960 Summer Olympics.

References

External links
 

1935 births
Living people
Belgian male cyclists
Olympic cyclists of Belgium
Cyclists at the 1960 Summer Olympics
Sportspeople from Liège
Cyclists from Liège Province
Walloon sportspeople